is a town located in Gifu, Japan. , the town had an estimated population of 15,072 in 5,291 households, and a population density of 830 persons per km2.

Geography
Anpachi is located in the northwestern portion of the Nōbi Plain in southwestern Gifu Prefecture. The Ibi River and the Nagara River flow through the town. The town is located in marshy flatlands and was often subject to flooding. The oldest portions of the town are protected by ancient embankments.  The town has a climate characterized by hot and humid summers, and mild winters  (Köppen climate classification Cfa).  The average annual temperature in Anpachi is 15.4 °C. The average annual rainfall is 1877 mm with September as the wettest month. The temperatures are highest on average in August, at around 27.7 °C, and lowest in January, at around 4.1 °C.

Neighbouring municipalities
Gifu Prefecture
Ōgaki
Hashima
Mizuho

Demographics
Per Japanese census data, the population of Ampachi has remained relatively steady over the past 50 years.

History
The area around Anpachi was part of traditional Mino Province, and the name of "Anpachi" appears in Nara period records, including the Nihon Shoki.  During the Edo period, it was mostly controlled by Ōgaki Domain. During the post-Meiji restoration cadastral reforms, the area was organised into Anpachi District, Gifu. In 1955, the three villages of Musubu, Namori and Maki merged to form the village of Apache. On April 1, 1960 Anpachi gained town status.

Economy
The mainstay of the local economy is agriculture (rice, vegetables, dairy, poultry), and light industry  (computer related products, dairy products, chemicals).

Education
Anpachi has three public elementary schools and two public middle schools operated by the town government. The town does not have a high school.

Transportation

Railway
The town has no passenger railway service.

Highway
  Meishin Expressway

Local attractions
The Solar Ark, an over 300m long photovoltaic power generation facility is located in the town.

Sister city relations

In Japan
 Fukui, Fukui, Japan (Friendship city)

Overseas
 Crowsnest Pass, Alberta, Canada (Friendship City)

Notable people from Anpachi
Arashiyama Jirō – silver medalist in Judo during 2004 Summer Olympics

References

External links

 

 
Towns in Gifu Prefecture